Thomas Alfred Davies (born 2003) is a Welsh professional footballer who plays as a left-back for EFL Championship club Cardiff City.

Career
Davies joined the youth academy of Cardiff City at the U14 level. He started playing as a midfielder, before converting to a left-back. He made his professional debut with Cardiff City in a 3–2 EFL Cup win over Sutton United on 10 August 2021.

International career
Davies is a youth international for Wales, having represented the Wales U18 in a friendly 0–0 (2–0) penalty shootout loss to the England U18s on 30 March 2021.

Career statistics

References

External links
 

2003 births
Living people
Wales youth international footballers
Welsh footballers
Cardiff City F.C. players
Association football fullbacks